Verity Anne Simmons; born 19 May 1991 in Grafton, New South Wales) is an Australian netball player. In 2012, Charles played her first season in the ANZ Championship with West Coast Fever. In 2014, she transferred to the Queensland Firebirds, and was part of a team that made the ANZ Championship Grand Finals in 2014. And in winning the premiership in 2015.  In 2016 she transferred back to West Coast Fever and was appointed vice-captain for the inaugural season of Suncorp Super Netball in 2017. She also appeared in Australian Ninja Warrior in 2019 and has made it to the semi-finals.
Now divorced from Rugby player Nathan Charles.

References 

Living people
1991 births
People from Grafton, New South Wales
Australian netball players
Queensland Firebirds players
West Coast Fever players
ANZ Championship players
Suncorp Super Netball players
Netball players from New South Wales
Australian Netball League players
Netball New South Wales Waratahs players
Western Sting players
Australian Institute of Sport netball players
Queensland Fusion players
Australia international Fast5 players
Rugby union players' wives and girlfriends